Peak is a 2007 young adult fiction novel by Roland Smith about the physical and emotional challenges that face a fourteen-year-old as he climbs Mount Everest as well as tall buildings in New York City after moving from Wyoming.

Reception 
Peak won the 2007 National Outdoor Book Award (Children's Category). It received a starred review from Publishers Weekly. Kirkus Reviews wrote, "The narrative offers enough of a bumpy ride to satisfy thrill seekers, while Peak’s softer reflective quality lends depth and some—but not too much—emotional resonance".

References

External links 
 Peak on Google Books

2007 American novels
American children's novels
American adventure novels
Mountaineering books
Novels set in Tibet
Mount Everest in fiction
2007 children's books